Basanta Kumar is an Indian name it may refer to

Basanta Kumar Biswas, Indian independence activist
Basanta Kumar Das (disambiguation), one of several people
Basanta Kumar Nemwang, Nepalese politician